Suzhoutong is a multi-use, store-value and contactless smart card used in Suzhou, Jiangsu, China, for public transport and other daily uses. It is similar to Beijing's Beijing Municipal Administration and Communications Card (Yikatong, 一卡通). In 2012, Suzhou Citizen Card was introduced by social security department of Suzhou, as well as the Suzhou Bank. According to them, Suzhoutong will be gradually replaced by Suzhou Citizen Card which has more features.

References

Transport in Suzhou
Fare collection systems in China
Contactless smart cards